The Nigerian shrew (Crocidura nigeriae) is a species of mammal in the family Soricidae. The animal is found in Benin, Burkina Faso, Cameroon, Ivory Coast, Nigeria, Togo, and there are claims of it also being found in Ghana. Its natural habitat is subtropical or tropical moist lowland forests.

References
 Hutterer, R. & Jenkins, P. 2004.  Crocidura nigeriae.   2006 IUCN Red List of Threatened Species.   Downloaded on 30 July 2007.

Crocidura
Mammals described in 1915
Taxonomy articles created by Polbot